Long Creek School is a public school in Long Creek, Oregon, United States. It is the only school in the Long Creek School District.

Academics
In 2008, 100% of the school's seniors received a high school diploma. Of two students, two graduated and none dropped out.

References

High schools in Grant County, Oregon
Public high schools in Oregon
Public middle schools in Oregon
Public elementary schools in Oregon